Zahner is a surname. Notable people with the surname include:

Fred  Zahner (1870–1900), American professional baseball catcher
L. William Zahner (born 1955), American president and CEO of Zahner Company 
Lee Zahner (born 1974), American volleyball player
Nico Zahner (born 1994), German footballer
Ruedi Zahner (born  1957), Swiss footballer
Simon Zahner (born 1983), Swiss cyclist

See also 
Zahner, is an architectural metal & glass company located in Kansas City, Missouri